Teja Ferfolja (born 20 September 1991) is a Slovenian handball player for CSM Roman and the Slovenian national team.

She participated at the 2016 European Women's Handball Championship.

References

External links

1991 births
Living people
Slovenian female handball players
Expatriate handball players
Slovenian expatriate sportspeople in Greece
Slovenian expatriate sportspeople in Romania
Slovenian expatriate sportspeople in Switzerland